The 2022 Thai FA Cup Final was the final match of the 2021–22 Thai FA Cup, the 28th season of a Thailand's football tournament organised by Football Association of Thailand. It was played at the Thammasat Stadium in Pathum Thani, Thailand on 22 May 2022, between Buriram United a big team from Buriram and Nakhon Ratchasima Mazda a big team from Nakhon Ratchasima, both are located in the Northeastern part of Thailand.

Route to the final

Note: In all results below, the score of the finalist is given first (H: home; A: away; T1: Clubs from Thai League 1; T2: Clubs from Thai League 2; T3: Clubs from Thai League 3.

Match

Details

Assistant referees:
 Chotrawee Tongduang
 Worapong Prasartsri
Fourth official:
 Kotchapoom Meesridaecha
Assistant VAR:
 Chaireag Ngam-som
 Chaowalit Poonprasit
Match Commissioner:
 Aris Kulsawadpakdee
Referee Assessor:
 Praew Semaksuk
General Coordinator:
 Nuttapon Phaopanus

Statistics

Winner

Prizes for winner
 A champion trophy.
 5,000,000 THB prize money.
 Qualification to 2023–24 AFC Champions League Play-offs.
 Qualification to 2022 Thailand Champions Cup.

Prizes for runners-up
 1,000,000 THB prize money.

See also
 2021–22 Thai League 1
 2021–22 Thai League 2
 2021–22 Thai League 3
 2021–22 Thai FA Cup
 2021–22 Thai League Cup
 2021 Thailand Champions Cup

References

External links
Thai League official website

2022
2